Caminito alegre is a 1944 Mexican film directed by Miguel Morayta and starring Sara García and Isabela Corona. The film's art director was Manuel Fontanals.

Cast
Sara García as Antonia Goyena
Isabela Corona as Madre superiora
Ángel Garasa as Don Maximiliano
Carmen Montejo as Hermana Isabel
Eduardo Arozamena as Don José Limón
Luis G. Barreiro as Cayetano
Arturo Soto Rangel as Don Gastón
Lucy Delgado as Hermana Isaura
Alejandro Ciangherotti as Luis
Manuel Noriega Ruiz as Don Julián
Pepe Martínez as Don Zacarias
Manuel Dondé as Señor (uncredited)

References

Bibliography
Peralta Gilabert, Rosa. Manuel Fontanals, escenógrafo: teatro, cine y exilio. Editorial Fundamentos, 2007.
Yankelevich, Pablo. México, país refugio: la experiencia de los exilios en el siglo XX. Plaza y Valdes, 2002.

External links
 

Mexican black-and-white films
Mexican comedy-drama films
1944 comedy-drama films
1944 films
1940s Mexican films